Dr. Reba Som (born, Darjeeling, West Bengal) is an academic, historian, writer and classical singer from India.  She was the director of Indian Council for Cultural Relations' Rabindranath Tagore Centre in Kolkata from 2008-2013.

Reba Som is also a trained singer of Rabindrasangeet and songs of Kazi Nazrul Islam. Her compact discs, "Selected Songs of Rabindranath Tagore" (III Millenneo, Rome, Italy 2003 and Saregama – India, May 2004) and "Love Songs of Kazi Nazrul Islam" (Times Music, 2016) include her English translations of the lyrics.

Personal life
Married to Foreign Service officer late Himachal Som in 1971, Reba has travelled all over the world on postings that include Brazil, Denmark, Pakistan, United States, Bangladesh, Canada, Laos, Italy amongst others. Rome was the last posting where her husband was India’s Ambassador. She has two sons Vishnu Som, one of India's leading television journalist and news anchor and Abhishek Som, a U.S based investment banker.

Works 
Som Reba, (2017) Margot:Sister Nivedita of Vivekananda, Penguin Random House, Delhi,

References

Indian women historians
20th-century Indian historians
Singers from West Bengal
Indian women classical singers
Living people
People from Darjeeling
Educators from West Bengal
Women educators from West Bengal
Year of birth missing (living people)
20th-century women writers
20th-century Indian women
Women musicians from West Bengal